is a Japanese ice hockey player and member of the Japanese national ice hockey team, currently playing with the Seibu Princess Rabbits in the Women's Japan Ice Hockey League (WJIHL) and All-Japan Women's Ice Hockey Championship.

Sasano represented Japan at the 2021 IIHF Women's World Championship. She participated in the women's ice hockey tournament at the 2017 Winter Universiade and won a bronze medal in the women's ice hockey tournament at the 2019 Winter Universiade. As a junior player with the Japanese national under-18 team, she participated in the 2014 IIHF Women's U18 World Championship.

References

External links 
 

Living people
1997 births
Sportspeople from Aomori Prefecture
Japanese women's ice hockey defencemen
Universiade medalists in ice hockey
Competitors at the 2017 Winter Universiade
Medalists at the 2019 Winter Universiade
Universiade bronze medalists for Japan